Jakubovany may refer to several villages in Slovakia:

Jakubovany, Liptovský Mikuláš
Jakubovany, Sabinov